Şehriyar Abış oglu Aliyev (born 25 December 1992) is an Azerbaijani professional footballer who plays as a defender for Keşla in the Azerbaijan Premier League.

Career
On 20 November 2011, Aliyev made his debut in the Azerbaijan Premier League for Baku match against Turan-Tovuz.

On 24 June 2020, Aliyev signed a one-year contract with Keşla FK.

Honours
Qarabağ
Azerbaijan Premier League (1): 2014–15
Azerbaijan Cup (1): 2014–15

Baku
Azerbaijan Cup (1): 2011–12

References

External links
 

1992 births
Living people
Association football defenders
Azerbaijani footballers
Azerbaijan international footballers
Azerbaijan under-21 international footballers
Azerbaijan Premier League players
FC Baku players
Qarabağ FK players
Kapaz PFK players
Sumgayit FK players 
Shamakhi FK players